Cotys VI  (Ancient Greek: Κότυς) was a king of the Odrysian kingdom of Thrace.

References

See also 
List of Thracian tribes

 
1st-century BC rulers in Europe
Odrysian kings